Spring Lake State Fish and Wildlife Area is an Illinois state park on  in Tazewell County, Illinois, United States.

The lakebed lies by the foot of the river's sandstone bluff in an abandoned bed of the river.

The lake, located in the southwestern corner of Tazewell County, has been extensively altered by dikes built in the 1900s (decade) and the 1950s.  The second dike system was built around both old Spring Lake and a second, smaller lake, Saiwell Lake, and caused the two lakes to almost merge into each other.  The two lakes are now only separated by a spur dike, and both lakes are now called halves of modern Spring Lake.

The nearest major town is Manito, Illinois.

Fishing
Spring Lake is managed by the Illinois Department of Natural Resources (IDNR) for largemouth bass, bluegill, bullhead, carp, channel catfish, crappie, muskie, northern pike, and sunfish.  The water of the lake, fed by abundant local springs, is cooler than most Illinois River lakes.

There are four boat launching ramps.

References

State parks of Illinois
Protected areas of Tazewell County, Illinois
Illinois River
Lakes of Illinois
Protected areas established in 1950
1950 establishments in Illinois
Landforms of Tazewell County, Illinois